The Bodrog is a river in eastern Slovakia and north-eastern Hungary. It is a tributary to the river Tisza. The Bodrog is formed by the confluence of the rivers Ondava and Latorica near Zemplín in eastern Slovakia. It crosses the Slovak–Hungarian border at the village of Felsőberecki (near Sátoraljaújhely) in Hungary, and Streda nad Bodrogom in Slovakia, where it is also the lowest point in Slovakia (94.3 m AMSL), and continues its flow through the Hungarian county Borsod-Abaúj-Zemplén, until it meets the river Tisza, in Tokaj. A town along its course is Sárospatak, in Hungary.

Its length is 67 km (15 in Slovakia, 52 in Hungary). Its watershed area is 13,579 km2 of which 972 km2 is in Hungary. The river is rich in fish.

References

 
Rivers of Slovakia
Rivers of Hungary
International rivers of Europe